Edward Leslie is a former professional wrestler better known as Brutus Beefcake.

Edward Leslie may also refer to:

Eddie Leslie, British actor
Sir Edward Leslie, 1st Baronet (1744–1818), Anglo-Irish politician

See also